Obi Onyeike (born 25 June 1992) is a Dutch professional footballer who plays for VVSB, as a defender.

Early and personal life
Onyeike was born in Zeist, Netherlands; his father is Nigerian. His brother Chima was also a footballer; both brothers have played for FC Dordrecht.

Career
Onyeike has played in the Eerste Divisie for Dordrecht since the 2012–13 season.

References

External links
 Voetbal International profile 

1992 births
People from Zeist
Dutch people of Nigerian descent
Living people
Dutch footballers
Association football defenders
FC Dordrecht players
Hereford United F.C. players
SV TEC players
VVSB players
Eerste Divisie players
Derde Divisie players
Tweede Divisie players
Dutch expatriate footballers
Expatriate footballers in England
Dutch expatriate sportspeople in England
Footballers from Utrecht (province)
Dutch sportspeople of African descent